Capital punishment is no longer applied in San Marino: the last execution was carried out in 1468 or in 1667, by hanging.

San Marino is one of only two countries in the world to have ceased carrying out executions prior to 1800 (the other is Liechtenstein, where the last execution took place in 1785).

San Marino was the first country in the world to abolish the death penalty for ordinary crimes, in 1848. In 1865, it became the second country in the world (and the first in Europe) to abolish the death penalty for all crimes, following Venezuela in 1863. It is one of only three countries to have abolished the death penalty for all crimes before 1900 (the third one being Costa Rica).

In 1989, it formally ratified Protocol 6 to the European Convention on Human Rights, which requires the complete abolition of the death penalty in peacetime. On 3 May 2002, it signed Protocol 13 to the European Convention on Human Rights, which requires the complete abolition of the death penalty, including in times of war or eminent threat of war. On 25 April 2003, it ratified Protocol 13. San Marino is also a state party to the Second Optional Protocol to the International Covenant on Civil and Political Rights, which it signed on 26 September 2003 and ratified on 17 August 2004.

San Marino voted in favor of the United Nations moratorium on the death penalty in 2007, 2008, 2010, 2012, 2014, 2016, 2018, and most recently, in 2020.

References

Law of San Marino
San Marino
Human rights abuses in San Marino